Samantha Hill may refer to:

 Samantha Hill (actress), Canadian actress and singer
 Samantha Hill (water polo) (born 1992), water polo player